The German women's national under 18 ice hockey team is the national under-18 ice hockey team of Germany. The team represents Germany at the International Ice Hockey Federation's U18 Women's World Championships and other international under-18 tournaments and events.

U18 Women's World Championship record 

^Includes one win in extra time (round robin and playoff round)
*Includes one loss in extra time (round robin)
**Includes two losses in extra time (preliminary and relegation round)

Team

Current roster
Roster for the 2023 IIHF World Women's U18 Championship.

Head coach: Franziska BuschAssistant coaches: Thomas Schadler, Anja Strohmenger

Head coaches
 Peter Kathan, 2007–08
 Werner Schneider, 2008–09
 Peter Kathan, 2009–10
 Werner Schneider, 2010–11
 Maritta Becker, 2011–2013
 Benjamin Hinterstocker, 2013–14
 Peter Kathan, 2014–15
 Thomas Kettner, 2015–2018
 Franziska Busch, 2018–
Source:

References

Ice hockey
Women's national under-18 ice hockey teams